Daniele Giustiniani (1615–1697) was a Roman Catholic prelate who served as Bishop of Bergamo (1664–1697).

Biography
Daniele Giustiniani was born on 6 Jun 1615.
On 23 Jun 1664, he was appointed during the papacy of Pope Alexander VII as Bishop of Bergamo.
On 6 Jul 1664, he was consecrated bishop by Pietro Vito Ottoboni, Bishop of Brescia. 
He served as Bishop of Bergamo until his death on 11 Jan 1697.

References

External links and additional sources
 (for Chronology of Bishops) 
 (for Chronology of Bishops) 

17th-century Roman Catholic bishops in the Republic of Venice
Bishops appointed by Pope Alexander VII
1697 deaths
1615 births
Bishops of Bergamo